Kuzun (also, Kiozun and Kyuzun) is a village and municipality in the Qusar Rayon of Azerbaijan.  It has a population of 1,091.  The municipality consists of the villages of Kuzun, Çətgün, and Laza.

References 

Populated places in Qusar District